"Are You What You Want to Be?" is a song by American indie pop band Foster the People. It serves as the opening track on their second studio album, Supermodel, and was released as the album's fourth single on September 8, 2014.

Release
An audio stream of "Are You What You Want to Be?" was uploaded by the band's Vevo account to YouTube on August 5, 2014 accompanied by its single cover. The song impacted contemporary hit radio in the United Kingdom on September 8, 2014 and modern rock radio in the United States on September 9, 2014 as the album's fourth single. The song is also used on EA Sports game, FIFA 15.

Personnel
Foster the People
 Cubbie Fink – bass
 Mark Foster – lead vocals, keyboards
 Mark Pontius – drums
 Sean Cimino – guitar
 Isom Innis – synthesizer

Charts

Release history

References

Foster the People songs
Columbia Records singles
2014 songs
2014 singles
Song recordings produced by Paul Epworth
Songs written by Greg Kurstin
Songs written by Mark Foster (singer)